Countess Rivers may refer to:

Jacquetta of Luxembourg (1415/16–1472) (wife of the 1st Earl)
Elizabeth Woodville, Countess Rivers (d.1473) (wife of the 2nd Earl)
Elizabeth Savage, Countess Rivers (née Darcy ; 1581–1650) (created countess for life in her own right in 1641)

Noble titles created in 1641
Extinct earldoms in the Peerage of England